Outcasts of the City is a 1958 American drama film directed by Boris Petroff and written by Stephen Longstreet. The film stars Osa Massen, Robert Hutton, Maria Palmer, Nestor Paiva, John Hamilton and George N. Neise. The film was released on January 10, 1958 by Republic Pictures.

Plot

Leda Mueller seeks refuge in the United States, claiming to be the wife of Jerry Seabrook, a missing World War II combat pilot. A sympathetic colonel requires proof, whereupon a priest vouches for Leda's marriage and also tells the colonel she is expecting a baby.

The colonel has knowledge that Jerry is alive, so Leda explains how they Jerry. A crash landing led to his taking refuge in an empty apartment that turned out to be hers. His co-pilot Biff is seriously injured, and by the time Leda can help find him, he is dead.

Hans Welton, a German jealous over Leda's interest in the American pilot, takes up with her best friend Helena and recruits her to find out anything she can about Jerry's wartime activities. As intrigue builds, it turns out that Jerry is being court-martialed and charged with the murder of Hans. In a courtroom, the circumstances of the German's death are explained, and Jerry then rushes to the side of Leda, who has given birth prematurely and near death.

Cast
Osa Massen as Leda Mueller
Robert Hutton as Lt. Gerald Seabrook
Maria Palmer as Helena Schiller
Nestor Paiva as Pastor Skira
John Hamilton as Colonel
George N. Neise as Hans Welton
Leon Tyler as Biff
Larry J. Blake as Hecker
Norbert Schiller as Doctor
Michael Dale as Sgt. Hammond
George Sanders as G.I. Announcer
John Close as Army Officer
John Clark as Army Officer
John Harding as Army Officer
James Wilson as Army Officer

See also
 List of American films of 1958

References

External links
 

1958 films
Republic Pictures films
1958 romantic drama films
American romantic drama films
Films scored by Harry Sukman
1950s English-language films
1950s American films